This is a timeline documenting events of Jazz in the year 1979.

Events

March
 3
 At Havana Jam, in Havana, Cuba, the Saturday evening show on 3 March was launched by the CBS Jazz All-Stars, composed of Dexter Gordon, Stan Getz, Jimmy Heath, Arthur Blythe, Woody Shaw, Hubert Laws, Bobby Hutcherson, Willie Bobo, Cedar Walton, Percy Heath and Tony Williams.

April
 6
The 6th Vossajazz started in Voss, Norway (April 6–8).

May

 23
The 7th Nattjazz started in Bergen, Norway (May 23 – June 6).
 25
The 13th Berkeley Jazz Festival started in Berkeley, California (May 25–27).
 1st day featured Al Jarreau, John Klemmer, Betty Carter, and Tony Williams Band
 2nd day featured Weather Report, Sonny Rollins, and Pat Metheny
 3rd day featured Dizzy Gillespie, Eddie Jefferson with Richie Cole, and A Special Tribute to Charles Mingus: Joni Mitchell, Jaco Pastorius, Don Alias, Herbie Hancock and Tony Williams.

June
 1
The 8th Moers Festival started in Moers, Germany (June 1–4).
 3
David Murray and the Sunny Murray Trio recorded Live at Moers during this festival.
 15
The 2nd Playboy Jazz Festival was held at the Hollywood Bowl in Los Angeles, with Bill Cosby as emcee.
 22
The 26th Newport Jazz Festival started in Newport, Rhode Island (June 22 – July 1).

July
 6
 The very first Copenhagen Jazz Festival started in Copenhagen, Denmark (July 6–15).
 The 13th Montreux Jazz Festival started in Montreux, Switzerland (July 6–24).
 12
Ella Fitzgerald performed at Montreux, accompanied by the Count Basie Orchestra, and her performance was released as A Perfect Match.
 13
 The 4th North Sea Jazz Festival started in The Hague, Netherlands (July 13–15).
 Beryl Bryden headlined the North Sea Jazz Festival with Rod Mason and His Hot Five, released on the album After Hours in 1980.
 16
Oscar Peterson performed at Montreux, accompanied by Niels-Henning Ørsted Pedersen, released as the album Digital at Montreux.
 21
The 10th Concord Jazz Festival started at Concord, California (July 21–23, 28–30).
 The festival featured artists like Ray Brown, Scott Hamilton, Don Menza with The Louie Bellson Orchestra and Dave Brubeck. Brubeck records his 1979 album release Back Home at this festival.

September
 14
The 22st Monterey Jazz Festival started in Monterey, California (September 14–16).

Unknown date
 The headline act on Friday night of the Bracknell Jazz Festival was Rocket 88, a boogie-woogie big band including Rolling Stones drummer Charlie Watts and Ian Stewart the "6th Stone" on piano along with bassist Jack Bruce, the Norwegian Jan Garbarek Group, London r'n'b legend Alexis Korner and an array of British horn-players.
 Nambassa 1979 was the largest music event in New Zealand.
 All That Jazz is released, an American musical film directed by Bob Fosse.

Album releases
Herb Alpert: Rise
Fred Anderson: Dark Day
Billy Bang: Distinction Without a Difference
Billy Bang: Sweet Space
Dollar Brand: African Marketplace
Anthony Braxton: Alto Saxophone Improvisations 1979
Guenter Christmann: Weavers
Crusaders: Street Life
Andrew Cyrille: Nuba
Lesli Dalaba: Trumpet Songs and Dances
Anthony Davis: Hidden Voices
Jack DeJohnette: Special Edition
Al Di Meola: Splendido Hotel
Michael Franks: Tiger in the Rain
Bunky Green: Places We've Never Been
Joseph Jarman: The Magic Triangle
George Lewis: Homage to Charles Parker
Jeff Lorber Fusion: Water Sign
Paul Lytton: The Inclined Stick
Cecil McBee: Alternate Spaces
Pat Metheny: American Garage
Paul Motian: Le Voyage
Amina Claudine Myers: Song for Mother E
James Newton: The Mystery School
Old And New Dreams: Old and New Dreams
Errol Parker: Doodles
Niels-Henning Ørsted Pedersen: Dancing on the Tables
Art Pepper: Straight Life
Max Roach & Anthony Braxton: One in Two – Two in One
Max Roach: Pictures in a Frame
Rova Saxophone Quartet: The Removal of Secrecy
Terje Rypdal: Descendre
Joe Sample: Carmel
Woody Shaw: Woody III
Martial Solal: Four Keys
Spyro Gyra: Morning Dance
String Trio of New York: First String
John Surman: Upon Reflection
Ralph Towner: Solo Concert
Warren Vaché: Polished Brass
Weather Report: 8:30
Eberhard Weber: Fluid Rustle
Kenny Wheeler: Around 6

Deaths

January 
 5
Charles Mingus, American upright bassist, composer and bandleader (born 1922).
 13
Sabu Martinez, American conguero and percussionist (born 1930).
 29
Sonny Payne, American drummer (born 1926).
 31
Grant Green, American guitarist and composer (born 1935).

February 
 15
Zbigniew Seifert, Polish jazz violinist (born 1946).
 22
Luděk Hulan, Czech upright bassist and musical organiser (born 1929).

March 

 25
Franco Manzecchi, Italian drummer (born 1931).
 29
Ray Ventura, French bandleader and pianist (born 1908).

April 

 10
 Gus Clark, Belgian pianist (born 1913).

May 
 9
Eddie Jefferson, American vocalist and lyricist (born 1918).
 21
Blue Mitchell, American trumpeter (born 1930).

June 
 13
Demetrio Stratos, Greek-Italian lyricist and multi-instrumentalist (born 1945).

July 
 8
Charles Kynard, American organist (born 1933).
 18
Matthew Gee, American bebop trombonist and part-time actor (born 1925).

August 

 24
 Teddy Smith, American jazz upright bassist (born 1932).
 25
 Stan Kenton, American pianist and composer (born 1911).

September 
 9
Wilbur Ware, American upright bassist (born 1923).
 19
 John Simmons, American upright bassist (born 1918).
 Lou Busch, American pianist, arranger and composer, a.k.a. Joe "Fingers" Carr (born 1910).

October 

 3
 Corky Corcoran, American tenor saxophonist (born 1924).
 8
 David Izenzon, American upright bassist (born 1932).

November 
 23
Henry Coker, American trombonist (born 1919).

December 
 16
Vagif Mustafazadeh,  Azerbaijani pianist and composer (born 1940).

Births

January 
 3
 Susana Santos Silva, Portuguese trumpeter.
 4
 Audun Ellingsen, Norwegian upright bassist.
 5
 Kathleen Edwards, Canadian singer-songwriter, guitarist, and violinist.

March 
 4
 Stein Urheim, Norwegian guitarist and composer.
 12
 Pascal Schumacher, Luxembourgian vibraphonist, percussionist, composer, and bandleader.
 26
 Hiromi Uehara, Japanese composer and pianist.
 30
 Norah Jones, American singer, pianist, songwriter, and actress.

April 
 2
 Stian Westerhus, Norwegian guitarist, Puma.
 20
 Kenneth Kapstad, Norwegian drummer, Gåte and Grand General.
 22
 Edith WeUtonga, Zimbabwean singer and bass guitarist.
 25
 Anat Cohen, Israeli clarinetist, saxophonist, and bandleader.
 30
 Tuomo Prättälä, Finnish pianist, keyboarder, and composer.

May 

 3
 Kudzai Sevenzo, Zimbabwean actress and singer.
 8
 Alf Wilhelm Lundberg, Norwegian guitarist, pianist, and composer.
 Ole Morten Vågan, Norwegian upright bassist, Motif.
 16
Hermund Nygård, Norwegian drummer and composer.
 21
Sonja Vectomov, Czech-Finnish electronic musician, composer, violinist, and pianist.

June 

 3
Corey Wilkes, American trumpeter.
 23
Susanna Wallumrød, Norwegian vocalist, Susanna and the Magical Orchestra.
 26
Mathias Eick, Norwegian trumpeter and multi-instrumentalist, Jaga Jazzist and Music for a While.

July 

 24
 Heidi Skjerve, Norwegian singer and composer.
 26
 Derek Paravicini, English blind autistic savant and musical prodigy.

August 

 1
Bjørn Vidar Solli, Norwegian guitarist, vocalist, and composer.
 10
 Ove Alexander Billington, Norwegian pianist and composer, Jaga Jazzist and Puma.
 20
 Jamie Cullum, British singer/songwriter, pianist, radio personality.
 28
 Jon Fält, Swedish drummer.

December 
 5
 Ilmari Pohjola, Finnish trombonist.
 10
 Tora Augestad, Norwegian singer and actor, Music for a While.
 20
 Benedikte Shetelig Kruse, Norwegian singer and actor, Pitsj.
 31
 Anat Cohen, Israeli clarinetist, saxophonist, and bandleader.

Unknown date 
 Espen Reinertsen, Norwegian saxophonist, flutist, and composer.
 Kristor Brødsgaard, Danish upright bassist, JazzKamikaze.
 Leo Genovese, Argentine pianist, keyboardist, and composer.

See also

 1970s in jazz
 List of years in jazz
 1979 in music

References

External links 
 History Of Jazz Timeline: 1979 at All About Jazz

Jazz
Jazz by year